The 2009 Northeast Conference men's basketball tournament was held on March 5, 8th, and 11th.  The tournament featured the league's top eight seeds. The tourney opened on March 5 with the quarterfinals, followed by the semifinals on March 8 and the finals on March 11. The champion, Robert Morris, earned a trip to the 2009 NCAA Tournament.

Format
The top eight eligible men's basketball teams in the Northeast Conference receive a berth in the conference tournament.  After the conference season, teams are seeded by conference record. The semifinals matchups will be the highest and lowest remaining seeds in one game and the other two seeds in the other game. All games are held at the home court of the higher-seeded team.

Bracket

All-tournament team
Tournament MVP in bold.

Sources
Tournament Bracket
Tournament Home Page

References

Tournament
Northeast Conference men's basketball tournament
Northeast Conference men's basketball tournament
Northeast Conference men's basketball tournament